Carlo Lurago (also spelled Luraghi) (1615 – 22 October 1684) was an Italian architect, who was most active in Prague.

He was born in Pellio Superiore in the Val d'Intelvi, near Como. At the age of 23, as an already an accomplished plasterer, he moved to Prague.  He would build several different Jesuit churches and cloisters there, including some at the Clementinum, in the early baroque style.  His first commission was the stucco decoration on the gothic St. Saviour Church in Prague.  He also worked on the Saint Eligius Chapel there in 1654, before his work was redone by Domenico Orsi.

Lurago was also successful outside of Bohemia. He developed the plans for the Passau Cathedral. It is notable because the main altar has a series of flat elliptical domes. This arch design foreshadows many other buildings of the baroque style. Another notable example of his work is the pilgrimage church of Maria Taferl, which had to be completed by Jakob Prandtauer after Lurago died in Passau.

Works
 1637–1659: Baroque town hall, Náchod
 1638–1648: St. Saviour, Prague
 1640–1642: Jesuit Church and College House, Březnice
 1650–1659: Modifications and enlargement of Náchod Castle
 c. 1650:   Modification of the Church of St. Mary-under-the-Chain, Malá Strana, Prague
 1651:      Modification of the Lobkowicz Palace, Prague
 1653–1660: The Clementinum, Old Town, Prague
 1653–1658: Modification and baroquification of the castle annex for the Counts of Herberstein, Gorzanów, Silesia
 1654–1666: Jesuit Church of the Assumption, Hradec Králové
 1654–1679: Church of the Immaculate Conception of the Virgin Mary and of Saint Ignatius, Klatovy
 1655–1661: Modification of the Castle in Nové Město nad Metují
 1657–1739: Church of the Nativity of Saint John the Baptist, Svatý Jan pod Skalou
 1658:      "Stone Birdhouses", Prague
 1659–1674: Cloister of the pilgrimage church of Svatá Hora in Příbram
 1578–1653: Clementinum, St. Salvator, Old Town, Prague
 1654–1690: Jesuit College Kłodzko, Silesia
 1663–1668: Cloister "im Waldl", Kladno
 1664:      New Inn, Tursko
 1665–1670: St. Ignatius Church, Prague
 1665–1670: Church of the Holy Trinity, Klášterec nad Ohří
 1666–1668: Hunting lodges for Humprecht Jan Czernin, Sobotka
 1668:      St. Stephen's Cathedral, Passau
 1670:      Pilgrimage church in Maria Taferl
 1673:      Jesuit college by the Church of St. Nicholas, Malá Strana, Prague
 1688:      Remodeling of St. Ignatius Church in Chomutov

References
The information in this article is based on that in its German equivalent.

1615 births
1684 deaths
People from the Province of Como
Italian Baroque architects